The Byoryolyokh (Börölööx) is a river in Yakutia in Russia. It flows into the Russko-Ustyinskaya, a left distributary of the Indigirka.

History
By the Byoryolyokh more than 8,000 bones from at least 140 woolly mammoths have been found in a single spot, apparently having been swept there by the current.

Etymology
The name of the river is based on the Yakut language "Börölöökh", meaning "teeming with wolves."

Course
The source of the Byoryolyokh is located at the confluence of two small rivers north of the Polousny Range. The river flows roughly northeastwards across the Yana-Indigirka Lowland.
The river is also known as "Yelon" in a section of its lower course. It joins the Indigirka from the left at the Russo-Ustinsky Canal, the western arm of the Indigirka River near its mouth, not far from Chokurdakh. 

The main tributaries of the Byoryolyokh are the Wese-Killah on the left; and the Ulakhan-Killah (Tiit), Selgannah and Ary-May on the right. 

There are more than nine thousand lakes in the basin of the Byoryolyokh River. It usually floods over its banks in July and August. In winter it freezes to the bottom.

See also
List of mammoth specimens
List of northernmost items
List of rivers of Russia

References

Rivers of the Sakha Republic